Zeynal Zeynalov (born 6 December 1979) is an Azerbaijani professional footballer & futsal player. As of 2009, he plays for Standard Sumgayit.

Career statistics

National team statistics

International goals

References

External links
 

1979 births
Living people
Footballers from Baku
Azerbaijani footballers
Azerbaijan international footballers
FK Standard Sumgayit players
FK MKT Araz players
Association football midfielders
Neftçi PFK players
European Games competitors for Azerbaijan
Beach soccer players at the 2015 European Games